Nai Nabhannu La is a Nepalese romantic drama film written and directed by Bikas Raj Acharya. The film stars Jiwan Luitel, Richa Singh Thakuri and Suman Singh in lead roles along with Mithila Sharma, Mukesh Acharya ame Hemangh Budhathoki in supporting roles. The film was released on 20 August 2010 with mixed response from critics but positive response from audience. The film was huge commercial success leading Jiwan Luitel to stardom. There were four sequels of the movies all of which were commercial successes and is the second highest grossing franchise in Nepal after Chhaka Panja(franchise). Nai Nabhannu La earned 3 crore across the country.

Cast

 Jiwan Luitel as Sisir
 Suman Singh as Basanta
 Richa Singh Thakuri as Ritu
 Mithila Sharma
 Mukesh Acharya
 Hemanta Budhathoki

Soundtrack

Nai Nabhannu La Series

Nai Nabhannu La (Released on 20 Aug 2010)(li) 
Nai Nabhannu La 2 (Released on 11 Apr 2014) (li) 
Nai Nabhannu La 3 (Released on 10 Apr 2015) (li) 
Nai Nabhannu La 4 (Released on 8 Apr 2016) 
Nai Nabhannu La 5 (Released on 24 Aug 2018) (li)

References

Nepalese romantic comedy films
Films shot in Kathmandu
2010 romantic comedy films
2010 films